The Hamlyn Book of Horror and S.F. Movie Lists is a book written by Roy Pickard and published in 1983.

Contents
The Hamlyn Book of Horror and S.F. Movie Lists is a book about horror and science fiction films.

Reception
Dave Langford reviewed The Hamlyn Book of Horror and S.F. Movie Lists for White Dwarf #50, and stated that "Good if you want to know about scenes cut from famous films, or 40 movie versions of Dracula, or King Kong's inside leg measurement: not exhaustive, but wide-ranging stuff."

Colin Greenland reviewed The Hamlyn Book of Horror and S.F. Movie Lists for Imagine magazine, and stated that "Amaze family and friends. Become absolutely insufferable."

Reviews
Review by Michael Klossner (1985) in Fantasy Review, January 1985

References

Science fiction books